Yukarıçaylı can refer to the following villages in Turkey:

 Yukarıçaylı, İnebolu
 Yukarıçaylı, Yenipazar